Gunehgar is a 1995 Indian Hindi-language action film produced by Kalyaani Singh, presented by Maann Singh, and directed by Vikram Bhatt, starring Mithun Chakraborty, Atul Agnihotri, Pooja Bhatt, Tisca Chopra and Kiran Kumar.

Plot
The film deals with the fight against terrorism, and Mithun plays the role of D.I.G. of Police. Ajay Thakur is a long-time employee serving with the Indian police force; his motive in life involves bringing justice to the freedom fighters, who in reality are terrorists headed by Habibullah and his younger brother, Munna. All of them are in reality on a deadly mission namely to separate Kashmir from India. Ajay meets with partial success when he shoots Munna, injuring him and thus arresting him in the process. This success gets him promoted to Deputy Inspector General (D.I.G). Later Munna manages to escape from custody and assassinates Ajay's wife whilst on the run. Meanwhile, Ajay's journalist sister, Pooja meets a guy, Rohit  who rescues her from her car after realising its fitted with a bomb. Pooja falls in love with Rohit but unbeknown to Pooja, Rohit is a mere pawn in the hands of Habibullah. His gang is holding Rohit's father as hostage so that he kidnaps Pooja and delivers her to his gang. Once Rohit does what Habibullah asks, his gang hold both Rohit and Pooja as hostages. Ajay manages to find out the gangs where-about which is an old mosque and he must go to negotiate the release of his sister, Pooja.

Cast

Mithun Chakraborty as D.I.G. Ajay Thakur
Atul Agnihotri as Rohit
Pooja Bhatt as Pooja Thakur
Tisca Chopra as Priya (as Priya Arora)
Kiran Kumar as Habibullah		
Mushtaq Khan as Maulvi
Anil Nagrath as Amirbaba
Vishwajeet Pradhan as Munna
Ishrat Ali as Mujihadeen member
Ram Sethi as Mujihadeen member
Girja Shankar as Indian Member of Parliament (Mantri)
Mahavir Shah as Noorudin "Noora"
Naresh Suri as Chachu

Soundtrack 

The music of the film was composed Shyam-Surender and the lyrics were penned by Seema Janam, Maann Singh, Mithlesh and Surender Saathi. The soundtrack was released in 1994 on audio cassette in Time Audio. The full album is recorded by Kumar Sanu, Sudesh Bhosle, Alka Yagnik and Sadhna Sargam.

References

External links
 

1995 films
1990s Hindi-language films
Films directed by Vikram Bhatt
Mithun's Dream Factory films
Films shot in Ooty
Indian action films
Films about terrorism in India
1995 action films